The Upper Sepik languages are a group of ten to a dozen languages generally classified among the Sepik languages of northern Papua New Guinea.

Languages
The Upper Sepik languages are:

Abau–Iwam
Abau
Iwam languages
Yellow and Wanibe Rivers
Amal–Kalou
Amal
Kalou
Ram languages (see)
Yellow River languages (see)

Although even the pronouns do not appear to be cognate, Foley classifies the Abau–Iwam languages with the Wogamus languages rather than with the Yellow and Wanibe River languages on the basis of a unique noun-class system in the numeral systems (see Wogamus languages#Noun classes). Additionally, Foley considers Sepik Iwam and Wogamusin noun class prefixes to be likely cognate with each other. Abau is more divergent, but its inclusion by Foley (2018) is based on the similarity of Abau verbal morphology to that of the Iwam languages.
Foley observes that much of the lexicon and pronouns of these languages do not derive from proto-Sepik.

Numerals
Upper Sepik morphological numerals are (Foley 2018):

{| 
! gloss !! Abau !! Sepik Iwam !! Wogamusin !! Chenapian
|-
! ‘one’
| -eyn ~ -mon ~ -ron || -or || -Vd || -rə
|-
! ‘two’
| -(r)eys || -is || -us || -si
|-
! ‘three’
| -(r)ompri || -um || -um || -mu
|}

References

 

 
Sepik languages